Ağsu FK is an Azerbaijani football club based in Agsu. The club is currently participating in the Azerbaijan First Division.

History 
The club was established in 2012 and immediately joined Azerbaijan First Division. On 18 May 2013, the club sealed promotion to Azerbaijan Premier League after winning first division. However, due to the decision of the Association of Football Federations of Azerbaijan about licensing, the club did not get promoted to the Premier league.

Stadium 

Agsu's home ground is Agsu City Stadium, which has a capacity of 3,000.

Achievements 
Azerbaijan First Division
 Winners (1): 2012–13

League and domestic cup history

Current squad 
(captain)''

Managers 
 Rufat Guliyev (2012–present)

References

External links 
 PFL

Football clubs in Azerbaijan
2012 establishments in Azerbaijan
Association football clubs established in 2012
Association football clubs disestablished in 2020
2020 disestablishments in Azerbaijan